Nonda Katsalidis  (born 1951) is a Greek-Australian architect. He is currently a practising director of architecture firm Fender Katsalidis Architects in partnership with Karl Fender.

Biography

Early life
Nonda Katsalidis was born in 1951 in Athens, Greece. He migrated to Melbourne, Australia when he was five years old, with his two-year-old brother and parents. He graduated from the University of Melbourne with a degree in architecture in 1976.

Career

From 1979 until 1983, he practised architecture alone on small projects. Among his earliest works, in 1972, was the Cafe Byzantium at 312 Drummond Street in Carlton Melbourne. He went on to design the nearby Deutscher Gallery and residence at 68 Drummond Street in 1983. In 1984, he designed the award-winning Metro Brasserie, 41 Bourke Street. The same year, he formed a small practice and in 1990, it had become an established company.

He designed a number of striking buildings on Latrobe Street which gained him attention as an upcoming designer and one of the youngest architects designing tall office buildings, culminating in the award-winning Argus Centre in 1991. In 1992, he gained a master's degree at RMIT. In 1996, he established Nation Fender Katsalidis, but due to Bob Nation's withdrawal from the partnership, it became Fender Katsalidis.

His big break was with his award-winning Melbourne Mondo Terrace Apartments, implemented as one of the first buildings under the Postcode 3000 planning strategy for increasing the residential population of Melbourne city centre. In 2002, the Government of Victoria's new planning blueprint ResCode was released, citing St Leonard's Apartments and Melbourne Terrace as two out of three examples of the model for medium-density housing in metropolitan Melbourne. He then became known for his cutting edge high-rise residential tower designs and became a developer of some of Australia's tallest residential buildings, such as the Eureka Tower.

He became a commercial architect and now participates in the financing and development of his designs which have evolved to be more subdued than his previous work.

Selected works
 171 La Trobe Street, Melbourne (1991)
 The Argus Centre, Latrobe Street, Melbourne (1991) (Fender Katsalidis)
 Melbourne Terrace Apartments, Franklin Street, Melbourne (1994) - a fanciful postmodern design featuring zig zag embellished exposed pre-fabricated concrete fins, use of architectural copper, and various classical sculptures at the entrance to each of the major pavilions. The building is listed as one of the Top 20 buildings in Australia of the 20th century by Architecture Australia in the December 1999 edition.
 Bendigo Art Gallery, Bendigo (1995) (redevelopment and extension)
 The Malthouse, Richmond (1997) (Fender Katsalidis) 
 St Leonards Apartments, St Kilda (1997) (Nation Fender Katsalidis)
 Ian Potter Museum of Art, University of Melbourne (1998) (Fender Katsalidis)
 Republic Tower. Corner Queen and Latrobe Streets, Melbourne (1999) (Fender Katsalidis)
 51 Spring Street, Melbourne (1999)
 Wills Tower, Melbourne (2002)
 New Quay Apartments, Melbourne Docklands (2002)
 HM@S Lonsdale, Port Melbourne (2003) (Fender Katsalidis)
 Conder (New Quay), Melbourne Docklands (2004)
 Eureka Tower, Melbourne (2006) (Fender Katsalidis)
 108 Flinders, 108 Flinders St Melbourne (2010) (Fender Katsalidis)
 Museum of Old and New Art, Hobart, Tasmania (2011)
 Phoenix Apartments, 82 Flinders St Melbourne, site of Phoenix Hotel (2011)

Awards
1984 -   RAIA (Vic) Merit Award ( Metro Brasserie)
1994 - RAIA (Vic) Architecture Award (Melbourne Terrace Apartments) 
1995 - City of Melbourne Building and Planning Award, City Postcode 3000 Award (Melbourne Terrace Apartments)
1999 - Victorian Architecture Medal, Melbourne Prize and William Wardell Award (for the Ian Potter Museum of Art)
2002 - Victorian Architecture Regional Prize - Bendigo Art Gallery; Victorian Architecture Award - Sydney Myer Asia Center
2021 - Member of the Order of Australia for "significant service to architecture, and to sustainable construction innovations"

Gallery of works

References

External links
Practice website
About the Ian Potter Museum of Art building

1951 births
Living people
Members of the Order of Australia
Greek emigrants to Australia
Architects from Melbourne
University of Melbourne alumni
RMIT University alumni
Academic staff of RMIT University